The Ford Mondeo is a large family car manufactured by Ford since 1993. The first Ford model declared as a "world car", the Mondeo was intended to consolidate several Ford model lines worldwide (the European Sierra, the Telstar in Asia and Australia, and the Tempo/Mercury Topaz in North America). The Mondeo nameplate is derived from the Latin word mundus, meaning "world". Thus Mondeo can be viewed as a Latin-derived brandname from multiple languages: Bourguignon monde, English monde, Esperanto mondo, Franco-Provençal  mondo, French monde, Friulian mond, Ido mondo, Istriot mondo, Italian mondo, Lombard mond, Occitan mond, Romansh (Surmiran dialect)  mond, Venetian móndo, Walloon monde, all meaning "world". For its first two generations, the Mondeo was produced using the CDW27 platform, with the third-generation model shifting to the EUCD platform. The fourth-generation models use the CD4 platform, and the fifth-generation use the C2 platform.

Due to declining sales and a growing trend towards crossover SUVs over saloons and estates, Ford announced in March 2021 that it will discontinue the production of the Mondeo in Europe and Argentina with no direct successor. Production of the Mondeo ended in Europe in March 2022.



First generation (1992) 

The first-generation Mondeo was introduced in November 1992, with sales beginning in March 1993. Intended as a world car, the first-generation Mondeo was significant as its design and marketing were shared between Ford USA in Dearborn and Ford of Europe. It replaced the Ford Sierra in Europe, the Ford Telstar in a large portion of Asia and other markets, while it is also sold as the Ford Contour and Mercury Mystique in North America to replace the Ford Tempo and Mercury Topaz. Unlike the Sierra, the Mondeo is front-wheel drive in its most common form, with a rarer four-wheel drive version available on the Mk I car only. Despite being billed as a world car, the only external items the Mondeo shared initially with the Contour built in Kansas City Assembly in Claycomo, Missouri, and Cuautitlán Assembly were the windscreen, front windows, front mirrors and door handles. Three body styles were available, which are saloon, liftback, and estate.

The mid-cycle facelift was launched in October 1996 leaving only the doors, the roof, and the rear quarter panels on the estate the same as the original model. The extensive redesign in 1996 was known as the Mondeo Mk II.

Second generation (2000) 

The second-generation Mondeo was introduced in October 2000. This Mondeo was considerably larger than its predecessor, while the basic chassis and suspension design was carried over from the previous generation along with the CDW27 platform. Following the standard setting interior of the Volkswagen Passat (B5) in 1996, Ford paid a great deal of attention to the second generation Mondeo's interior and was the first major American manufacturer to react to the new standard set by Volkswagen. Ford abandoned its New Edge design theme for the second generation, opting to take the Prodigy concept car as a design reference. Ford dispensed with the rounded American style interior of the first generation, and developed a more sober 'Germanic' design. Saloon, liftback, and estate body styles were available.

This Mondeo came to Mexico, replacing the North American built Ford Contour, and was sold from 2001 to 2007, when the Ford Fusion replaced it. The second generation Mondeo was never sold in Australia, as Ford Australia argued that the segment of the market was in decline.

Third generation (2006) 

The third-generation Mondeo was introduced in late 2006. Based on the EUCD platform developed with Volvo, the platform was the same as that used in the new large MPVs Galaxy and S-MAX. Its design theme was first shown as the Ford Iosis concept at the 2005 Frankfurt Motor Show, which gave an indication to the look of the Mk IV Mondeo. The new car, in estate bodystyle, was pre-launched in 'concept' form at the Paris Motor Show in September 2006.

As with the previous model, the Mk IV Mondeo was not marketed in the United States or Canada because Ford sold the same-class Fusion, which was launched in 2005. The 2007 Mondeo marked the return to the Australian market after a six-year absence, due to a resurgence in popularity of medium-sized cars in the last few years.

In September 2010, a mid-cycle facelifted Mk IV Mondeo was introduced with some changes, such as the new EcoBoost engines and LED daytime running lights. The front and rear of the car had minor changes, the biggest being the new design theme dubbed as the Kinetic Design. The interior was improved, with a use of better materials.

Fourth generation (2012) 

The fourth-generation Mondeo was unveiled by Ford at the 2012 North American International Auto Show in Detroit, Michigan. Due to the merge of both models, the vehicle is sold as the Fusion in the Americas. With a design team based in Detroit for the planning and global launch phase, the new model takes many styling cues from the previous generation Ford Mondeo, and previous generation American Ford Fusion. Like the newest redesigns of the Focus and Fiesta before it, the new Mondeo is set on a global platform shared with the now-identical Fusion sold in North America.

The range does not include five- or six-cylinder engines, and on launch will have a complete range of Ford EcoBoost engines.

Ford ceased production of the Mondeo at their Valencia Plant in March 2022 as Mondeo sales dwindled with buyers preferring crossovers and SUVs.

Fifth generation (2022) 

The fifth-generation Mondeo saloon was released in China in January 2022. Ford confirmed that the model would not be marketed in Europe and North America. It is marketed in the Middle East as the Ford Taurus.

Motorsport 

The Mondeo competed in the British Touring Car Championship (BTCC) between 1993 and 2000. The cars, prepared by former series champion Andy Rouse, did not enter the 1993 season until the eighth round, at Pembrey, in Wales. Rouse and Paul Radisich were the drivers in the Mondeo's first season. Radisich went on to win the FIA World Touring Car Cup in both 1993 and 1994 driving a Mondeo.

Ford ran a factory-sponsored team, called Ford Team Mondeo, for eight seasons. Andy Rouse Engineering ran the cars from 1993 to 1995, when West Surrey Racing ran the works team from 1996 to 1998, with Prodrive taking over beginning 1999.

In 2000, the team expanded from two cars to three when drivers Alain Menu and Anthony Reid were joined by 1998 series champion Rickard Rydell, recruited from the disbanded Volvo team. The team dominated the season of 2000, finishing 1–2–3 (Menu–Reid–Rydell) in the drivers' standings and winning the manufacturers' championship by 104 points.

A complete overhaul of the BTCC following the season of 2000 had the Super Touring regulations scrapped as the series moved towards less expensive, but slower race cars. Ford withdrew from BTCC competition prior to 2001.

The touring cars, after their withdrawal, went on sale to the public and are now in the hands of other drivers. Two of the 2000 series Mondeos have been spotted in the BRSCC series of LMA Euro saloons; drivers known to own them at present are Bernard Hogarth and Alvin Powell.

The Mk I and Mk II Mondeo have followed many other previous Ford models into the world of banger racing in the United Kingdom, and with plenty of older cars being available for very little money, the Mondeo is now a popular and relatively easy car to race. The Zetec engines are converted to run off a carb set up and the Mondeo bodyshell is fairly tough, but they are proving rather rigid, with many drivers getting injured in high-speed impacts. Mondeos are proving more popular than the Sierra and Mk III Granada.

In Argentina, the Mondeo is one of several cars to compete in the local Top Race racing category; its body is handcrafted in reinforced fiberglass. The Mondeo is so far the most successful car in the category, with three championship titles in the TRV6 class and two championship titles in the Top Race series (formerly Top Race Junior).

The winning drivers in the TRV6 class were Omar Martínez (2006), José María López (2009), and Guido Falaschi (Copa América 2010) with the Mondeo II (based on the MkIII Mondeo), and in the TR Junior category, the championship was won by Gonzalo Perlo in 2008 and Humberto Krujoski in 2010. In 2009, the Mondeo III (based on the MkIV Mondeo) bodystyle was approved and presented as an option within the category; however, the Mondeo II bodywork is still being used.

Similarly, in the United States, the Fusion/Mondeo Mk 5 bodywork began use for the sixth-generation body in the NASCAR Sprint Cup Series starting in 2013, replacing the current Mazda6-based Fusion.

Awards

Sales

See also 
 Mondeo Man, stereotypical figure in the 1990s England

References

External links 

 
 
 Ford Mondeo Sport Club - biggest fan club at Taiwan

 
Euro NCAP large family cars
Front-wheel-drive vehicles
All-wheel-drive vehicles
Hatchbacks
Sedans
Station wagons
Cars introduced in 1992
Touring cars
Ford CD4 platform